EMBOSS is a free open source software analysis package developed for the needs of the molecular biology and bioinformatics user community. The software automatically copes with data in a variety of formats and even allows transparent retrieval of sequence data from the web. Also, as extensive libraries are provided with the package, it is a platform to allow other scientists to develop and release software in true open source spirit. EMBOSS also integrates a range of currently available packages and tools for sequence analysis into a seamless whole.

EMBOSS is an acronym for European Molecular Biology Open Software Suite. The European part of the name hints at the wider scope. The core EMBOSS groups are collaborating with many other groups to develop the new applications that the users need. This was done from the beginning with EMBnet, the European Molecular Biology Network. EMBnet has many nodes worldwide most of which are national bioinformatics services. EMBnet has the programming expertise.
In September 1998, the first workshop was held, when 30 people from EMBnet went to Hinxton to learn about EMBOSS and to discuss the way forward.

The EMBOSS package contains a variety of applications for sequence alignment, rapid database searching with sequence patterns, protein motif identification (including domain analysis), and much more.

The AJAX and NUCLEUS libraries are released under the GNU Library General Public Licence. EMBOSS applications are released under the GNU General Public Licence.

EMBOSS application groups

See also
Open Bioinformatics Foundation
Soaplab - A SOAP web service interface including EMBOSS
Genostar - Integration of some of EMBOSS tools in a graphical application

References

External links

Bioinformatics software
Free science software
Science and technology in Cambridgeshire
South Cambridgeshire District